Puerto Sánchez Airport  is an airport serving Puerto Sánchez (es), a village on the north shore of General Carrera Lake in the  Aysén Region of Chile. The runway is just west of the village.

There is mountainous terrain northwest through east. Southeasterly approach and departure are over the water.

See also

Transport in Chile
List of airports in Chile

References

External links
OpenStreetMap - Puerto Sánchez
OurAirports - Puerto Sánchez
FallingRain - Puerto Sánchez Airport

Airports in Chile
Airports in Aysén Region